Broussey-Raulecourt is a commune in the Meuse department in Grand Est in northeastern France.

Geography
The Broussey-en-Woëvre village lies on the left bank of the Rupt de Mad, which flows northwest through the commune. Raulecourt, the other village in the commune, is located in its eastern part.

Population

See also
Communes of the Meuse department
Parc naturel régional de Lorraine

References

External links

 Official website

Communes of Meuse (department)